Martin Tomczyk (born 7 December 1981) is a German professional racing driver, and BMW Motorsport works driver.

He was the DTM champion in 2011, third in 2007, fourth in 2006 and fifth in 2004, having won eight races.

Racing career

After a karting career, he raced in Formula BMW and Formula Three, where he finished 12th in 2000.

In 2001 he moved up to the Deutsche Tourenwagen Masters. In 2000 his best result was a fourth place on the Nürburgring where he also took the fastest of the race. He took his first pole position in Hockenheim 2002 but he retired from the race. In 2004 he took his first podium in Estoril. During 2004 he also finished second in Zandvoort, Oschersleben and Hockenheim on his way to finish fifth in the championship. Tomczyk took his first win in Catalunya 2006 where he also took pole. In 2007 he took two wins to finish third that season.

Eleven years after his DTM debut, he won the championship in 2011, driving for Team Phoenix, after nine races with three wins and a third-place finish in Valencia. In 2012, Tomczyk was signed as a BMW Team RBM driver, moving to Team RMG in 2013.

His father Hermann is president of the Deutscher Motor Sport Bund.

After BMW's DTM program was reduced in 2017, Tomczyk retired from the series and continued driving with the Bavarian manufacturer in the IMSA WeatherTech SportsCar Championship.

Following his retirement from full-time racing, Tomczyk became the series manager of the DTM Trophy. In 2023, he became the managing director of Abt Sportsline.

Racing record

Career summary

‡ Does not include non-championship races.
* Season still in progress.

Complete Deutsche Tourenwagen Masters results
(key)

† Retired, but was classified as he completed 90% of the winner's race distance. 
1 -  A non-championship one-off race was held in 2004 at the streets of Shanghai, China.

Complete WeatherTech SportsCar Championship results
(key) (Races in bold indicate pole position) (Races in italics indicate fastest lap)

Complete FIA World Endurance Championship results
(key) (Races in bold indicate pole position; races in italics indicate fastest lap)

Complete 24 Hours of Le Mans results

References

External links

  
 

1981 births
Living people
German racing drivers
People from Rosenheim
Sportspeople from Upper Bavaria
Racing drivers from Bavaria
Formula BMW ADAC drivers
German Formula Three Championship drivers
Deutsche Tourenwagen Masters drivers
Deutsche Tourenwagen Masters champions
ADAC GT Masters drivers
WeatherTech SportsCar Championship drivers
FIA World Endurance Championship drivers
24 Hours of Le Mans drivers
24 Hours of Daytona drivers
Audi Sport drivers
BMW M drivers
Abt Sportsline drivers
Phoenix Racing drivers
Schnitzer Motorsport drivers
Rahal Letterman Lanigan Racing drivers
Rowe Racing drivers
Nürburgring 24 Hours drivers